Jamal Chavoshifar (also Romanized as "Jamāl Chāvoshifar", IPA: ʤæ'mɒːl ʧɒːvoʃiː'fæɾ, born 1990) is an Iranian swimmer who specialized in the backstroke.

Swimming career 
Born on 19 August, 1990 into a family of sportsmen and encouraged by his father, Jamal Chavoshifar engaged in swimming as a child. At first he chose the breaststroke and won the first medal of his life in one of its styles. But he gradually inclined to the butterfly stroke, and finally began his specialty, that is the backstroke, at the age of sixteen.

In his first abroad competition, Jamal managed to break the 50m and 100m backstroke records of Iran at the Malaysian Competitions in 2008, when he was eighteen.

Chavoshifar holds the Iranian records of 50, 100, and 200 m events of the backstroke in short course pools, as well as the records of 50 and 100 m events of the same style in long course pools. He has been continuously improving his records during his championship period.

Historic records 
 Chavoshifar is the first Iranian swimmer to swim the 100m backstroke in less than a minute.
 Chavoshifar is the first Iranian swimmer to swim the 50m backstroke in less than 26 seconds.
 Chavoshifar is the first Iranian swimmer to gain the entrance record of the backstroke for WorldSkills Kazan 2019 in Russia.

Team records 
In addition to the above-mentioned records, Chavoshifar holds the records of the three events of long course relay 4×100m, short course relay 4×50m, and short course relay 4×100m.

Best results

See also 
 List of Iranian records in swimming

References

1985 births
Living people
Iranian male swimmers
Male backstroke swimmers
Sportspeople from Isfahan
Swimmers at the 2010 Asian Games
Swimmers at the 2014 Asian Games
Asian Games competitors for Iran
Islamic Solidarity Games competitors for Iran